Winner of the All American Futurity, Rocket Wrangler (1968–1992) went on to sire Dash For Cash.

Life

Rocket Wrangler was a 1968 son of American Quarter Horse Hall of Fame member Rocket Bar a Thoroughbred stallion. Rocket Wrangler was out of Go Galla Go, a daughter of another Hall of Fame member Go Man Go.

Racing career 
Rocket Wrangler won ten times on the racetrack, finishing second four times and third another four times, earning $252,167 in race earnings. His highest speed index was 97. He won the All American Futurity and the Rainbow Futurity, and finished second in the All American Congress Futurity.

Breeding record 
After retiring, Rocket Wrangler went on to sire 56 stakes winners, including Hall of Fame member Dash For Cash. His foals earned over $9,400,000 on the racetrack.

Death and honors 
Rocket Wrangler died on November 29, 1992. He was inducted into the AQHA Hall of Fame in 2010.

Pedigree

Notes

References

 
 

American Quarter Horse racehorses
American Quarter Horse sires
1968 racehorse births
1992 racehorse deaths
AQHA Hall of Fame (horses)